Eriolarynx australis, called mini angel's trumpet or blue angel's trumpet, is a species of flowering plant in the genus Eriolarynx, native to Bolivia and northwest Argentina. It is widely listed in the horticultural literature under the synonym Iochroma australe. It has gained the Royal Horticultural Society's Award of Garden Merit.

It is hardy in mild regions, otherwise must be grown under glass. It needs a sheltered position in full sun.

The Latin specific epithet australis means "southern".

Some cultivars are known, originally described under the synonym Iochroma australe:
 E. australe 'Andean Snow'
 E. australe 'Bill Evans'
 E. australe 'Sunrise'

References

Solanaceae
Plants described in 1874